Paranisopodus is a genus of beetles in the family Cerambycidae, containing the following species:

 Paranisopodus acutus (Thomson, 1865)
Paranisopodus amoenus Monné & Monné, 2017
Paranisopodus antonkozlovi Nascimento & Santos-Silva, 2019
Paranisopodus araguaensis Monne & Monne, 2007
 Paranisopodus genieri Monne & Monne, 2007
 Paranisopodus granulosus Monne & Monne, 2007
 Paranisopodus heterotarsus Monné & Martins, 1976
 Paranisopodus hovorei Monne & Monne, 2007
 Paranisopodus paradoxus Monné & Martins, 1976
 Paranisopodus peruanus Monne & Monne, 2007
Paranisopodus thalassinus Santos-Silva & Devesa, 2021

References

Acanthocinini